Die Liebe und der Co-Pilot is an East German romantic comedy film directed by Richard Groschopp. It was released in 1961.

External links
 

1961 films
East German films
1960s German-language films
1961 romantic comedy films
German aviation films
Films directed by Richard Groschopp
German romantic comedy films
1960s German films